Etofenamate is a nonsteroidal anti-inflammatory drug (NSAID) used for the treatment of joint and muscular pain. It is available for topical application as a cream, a gel or as a spray.

Etofenamate is acutely toxic if swallowed; it is also very toxic to aquatic life, with long lasting effects.

References 

Nonsteroidal anti-inflammatory drugs
Trifluoromethyl compounds
Anthranilates
Ethers
Primary alcohols